Shast Pich-e Sofla (also Romanized as Shaşt Pīch-e Soflá) is a village in Bezenjan Rural District, in the Central District of Baft County, Kerman Province, Iran. At the 2006 census, its population was 169, in 42 families.

References 

Populated places in Baft County